Paweł Buzała (born 27 December 1985) is a Polish former football who played as a forward.

Career
He is a former player of Lech Poznań. He joined Lechia Gdańsk after he left Lech Poznań.

In February 2011, he signed a three-year contract with GKS Bełchatów.

References

External links 
 

1985 births
Living people
Polish footballers
Lech Poznań players
Lechia Gdańsk players
Lechia Gdańsk II players
GKS Bełchatów players
Ekstraklasa players
People from Złotów
Sportspeople from Greater Poland Voivodeship
Association football forwards